Viguen (born Viguen Derderian, Viguen Derderyân; , Vigen Tērtērian; 23 November 1929 – 26 October 2003), known as "King of Iranian pop" and the "Sultan of Jazz", was an Iranian pop music singer and actor, well known throughout the Near East. Viguen sang both in Persian and Armenian.

Viguen was of Iranian-Armenian ethnicity and during the golden age of Persian pop (the early 1970s) until the 1979 Islamic Revolution, many Iranian performers and celebrities—among them Delkash, Pouran, and Elaheh—yearned to be associated with him.

Viguen's innovative and upbeat style of music had a great influence on paving the way for a new genre of Iranian music, influenced by Western European and Latin American styles. His musical and performing talents soon captured the attention of many prominent Iranian lyricists and composers such as Parveez Vakili and Kareem Fakkour, and together they created some of Iran's most memorable songs.

Early life 
Viguen was born into an Iranian-Armenian family of eight children in the western Iranian city of Hamadan. His father died of complications related to pneumonia when Viguen was only eight years old. His mother and older brother Zaven raised him after moving away from the family property due to a family disagreement. His older brother Karo was a well-known Iranian poet and wrote the lyrics for Viguen's signature song, "Lala'ee" (Lullaby).

During World War II, the family moved to the northern city of Tabriz where local Azerbaijani nationalists declared the area a separatist republic, with the help of the occupying Soviet forces. This is where Viguen bought his first guitar from a Russian soldier and discovered his affinity for American, Italian and Spanish music and adopted many of those melodies for his songs with Persian lyrics that became some of Iran's most popular music to date.

Artistic rising 
In his mid teens, Viguen moved to Tehran and in 1951 he was hired to perform at the Café Shemiran, an upscale restaurant & bar on the northern outskirts of the capital city.

Equated to Elvis Presley by some fans in Iran, Viguen's debonair looks and his tall and athletic physique added to his appeal as Iran's first male pop star – particularly among young Iranian women at a time when ideas of emancipation and liberalism were taking hold in the 1950s and 60s. He was also one of the first Iranian entertainers to perform with a guitar.

Later works 
Viguen moved to the United States in 1971 and settled in California. He would return to Iran yearly to do concerts and perform in Vegas-styled nightclubs. After the Islamic Revolution of 1979, he was exiled to the United States because pop music was no longer allowed in Iran. He celebrated the 50th anniversary of his career at the Hollywood Palladium in Los Angeles in February 2001.

Some of his most notable songs are "Baroon Barooneh" (It's Raining), "Asb-e Ablagh" (Thoroughbred Horse), "Mahtab" (Moonlight), Lala'ee (Lullaby), "Gol-e Sorkh" (Red Rose), "Ragheeb" (Rival), "Simin-bari", "Awazekhan" (The Singer) and "Del-e Divaneh" (Crazy Heart). More than 600 songs were recorded during his long career.

Film 
Viguen's cinematic debut came in 1955 when he was discovered by the prominent Armenian-Iranian director Samuel Khachikian for a role in his film "Chaharrah-e Havades" (Crossroads of Incidents). In later years, he played roles in many other motion pictures by Khachikian and other producers, among them "Zalembala" (1956, Siamak Yasami), "Tappeh-eh Eshgh" (1959, Khachikian), "Arshin Malalan" and "Cheshmeh Oshagh" (1960, Samad Sabahi),"Atash Khakestar" (1961, Khosro Parizi), "Arooseh Darya" (1965, Arman). He later on founded "Viguen Film" to produce his own movies but did not pursue the enterprise.'

Filmography

Personal life 
His first wife was named Olga and they had three daughters together, including actress Aylin (also known as Eileen or Ailen), Aylin's fraternal twin sister, singer Jaklin Munns (also known as Jacqueline), and Katrin. His second wife was named Nadia and they had one daughter named, Evelyn, and one son named Edwin Derderian. His third wife was Karen Holston Derderian (1951–2015) and he had a step-daughter, Robin Navonne Brakefield.

Death 
Viguen died at home on 26 October 2003 from cancer and was buried at Pierce Brothers Valley Oaks Cemetery in Westlake Village, California. At the time of his death he had recorded more than six hundred songs, starred in six motion pictures and made guest appearances on various popular TV shows including The Bob Hope Specials, The Jack Benny Show and the TV series Mission Impossible.

See also 
 List of Iranian musicians
 Music of Iran
 Persian pop music
 List of Iranian Armenians
 List of Iranian Americans
 Rock and alternative music in Iran

Notes

References

Further reading

External links 
Vigen Death in BBC 
Vigen Biography on BBC Persian
Vigen Bio on Iranian Chamber
Sheet Music of songs by Viguen

1929 births
2003 deaths
Iranian composers
Iranian Christians
Iranian guitarists
Iranian pop singers
People from Hamadan
Iranian male singers
Male singers on Golha
Iranian pop musicians
Caltex Records artists
Taraneh Records artists
Persian-language singers
Iranian male film actors
Ethnic Armenian musicians
Armenian-language singers
American male pop singers
Iranian singer-songwriters
Ethnic Armenian male singers
Deaths from cancer in California
20th-century Iranian male singers
Iranian people of Armenian descent
20th-century American male singers
20th-century American singers
American people of Armenian descent
Burials at Valley Oaks Memorial Park
Iranian emigrants to the United States
Exiles of the Iranian Revolution in the United States